

Psychology

Notes